Marina Ivanova-Kharlamova (born 24 May 1962) is a Russian former Soviet track and field sprinter. She set 400 metres personal bests of 50.63 seconds outdoors and 52.23 seconds indoors. She was the national champion at the Soviet Indoor Athletics Championships in 1989.

She won bronze medals with the Soviet Union women's 4 × 400 metres relay team at the 1983 World Championships in Athletics (with Yelena Korban, Irina Baskakova and Mariya Pinigina) and at the 1979 European Athletics Junior Championships (with Lyubov Kiryukhina, Aldona Mendzoryte and Liliya Tuznikova).

International competitions

National titles
Soviet Indoor Athletics Championships
400 m: 1989

See also
List of World Championships in Athletics medalists (women)

References

External links



Living people
1962 births
Russian female sprinters
Soviet female sprinters
World Athletics Championships athletes for the Soviet Union
World Athletics Championships medalists